Caernarfon was a parliamentary constituency centred on the town of Caernarfon in Wales. It elected one Member of Parliament (MP) by the first past the post system.

The constituency was created in 1536 as a District of Boroughs, represented in the House of Commons of England until 1707, in the House of Commons of Great Britain from 1707 to 1800, and in the House of Commons of the United Kingdom from 1801 to 1950.  The District of Boroughs was abolished in 1950, and replaced with a county constituency of the same name, which was itself abolished in 2010.

History
Known as Carnarvon until 1832, and then as the Carnarvon Boroughs or Carnarvon District of Boroughs from 1832 to 1950 and as Caernarvon from 1950 to 1983, it is named after Caernarfon, the main town within the constituency. Its most famous member was David Lloyd George, who was MP for 55 years. When Lloyd George became prime minister in 1916 it became the first Welsh constituency to be represented by a serving prime minister.
Plaid Cymru held the seat continuously from 1974 until its abolition in 2010, longer than they have held any other seat.

Boundaries 
The constituency names, in this section, follow the format and the spelling used by F. W. S. Craig in his British Parliamentary Election Results series. Variations may be found in other sources.

Caernarvon 1536–1832 
On the basis of information from several volumes of the History of Parliament, it is apparent that the history of the borough representation from Wales and Monmouthshire is more complicated than that of the English boroughs.

The Laws in Wales Act 1535 (26 Hen. VIII, c. 26) provided for a single borough seat for each of 11 of the 12 Welsh counties and Monmouthshire. The legislation, which was passed in 1536 (using the modern civil year starting on 1 January), was ambiguous as to which communities were enfranchised. The county towns were awarded a seat, but this in some fashion represented all the ancient boroughs of the county, as the others were required to contribute to the member's wages. It is not clear if the burgesses of the contributing boroughs could vote. The only election under the original scheme was for the 1542 Parliament. It seems that only burgesses from the county towns actually took part. An Act of 1544 (35 Hen. VIII, c. 11) confirmed that the contributing boroughs could send representatives to take part in the election at the county town. As far as can be told from surviving indentures of returns, the degree to which the out boroughs participated varied, but by the end of the 16th century all the seats had some participation from them at some elections at least.

The original scheme was modified by later legislation and decisions of the House of Commons, which were sometimes made with no regard to precedent or evidence: for example in 1728 it was decided that only the freemen of the borough of Montgomery could participate in the election for that seat, thus disenfranchising the freemen of Llanidloes, Welshpool and Llanfyllin.

In the case of Caernarvonshire (now Caernarfonshire), the county town was Caernarvon (now known as Caernarfon). The out boroughs were Conway (now Conwy), Criccieth (or Cricieth), Nevin (now known as Nefyn), and Pwllheli. The freemen of the five boroughs were entitled to vote. In the 1715–1754 period there were estimated to be about 1,600 freemen, of whom about 1,200 were non-resident. Later in the 18th century the estimated electorate was about 1,000 freemen.

Caernarvon Boroughs 1832–1950 

The Caernarvon Boroughs was a district of boroughs constituency, which grouped a number of parliamentary boroughs in Caernarvonshire into one single member constituency. The voters in each participating borough cast ballots, which were added together over the whole district to decide the result of the poll. The enfranchised communities in this district, from 1832, were the six boroughs of Caernarvon, Bangor, Conway, Criccieth, Nevin, and Pwllheli.

The exact boundaries of the parliamentary boroughs in the district were altered by the Parliamentary Boundaries Act 1868, but the general nature of the constituency was unchanged. There were no further boundary changes in the 1885 redistribution of parliamentary seats.

In 1918 the constituency was redefined, to include the then local government areas of the Municipal Boroughs of Bangor, Caernarvon, Conway, and Pwllheli; the Urban Districts of Criccieth, Llandudno, Llanfairfechan and Penmaenmawr, as well as the parish of Nevin.

From 1918 to 1950 the administrative county of Caernarvonshire was divided into two seats: Caernarvon Boroughs and a Caernarvonshire county constituency. The territory of the borough seat was enclaved within the county constituency. Different local authorities, included in the borough constituency, were not necessarily adjoining.

Caernarvon 1950–1983 
The redistribution, which took effect in 1950, created two Caernarvonshire county divisions – Caernarvon  in the south-western two thirds of the county and Conway (later spelt Conwy) in the north-eastern third. The new divisions included territory which had come from both of the two old seats.

The local authorities, whose territories were combined to form the constituency in 1950, were the Municipal Boroughs of Caernarvon, and Pwllheli; the Urban Districts of Criccieth, and Portmadoc; as well as the Rural Districts of Gwyrfai and Lleyn. This arrangement was not altered by the redistribution which took effect in February 1974, which was based on the pre-1974 local government boundaries.

From 1 April 1974, a new pattern of counties was created in Wales. This constituency became part of the county of Gwynedd.

Caernarfon from 1983 
In the redistribution of 1983, the spelling of the official name of the constituency was changed. The constituency boundary was unchanged, but it was redefined in terms of the local authorities created in 1974. It comprised the Borough of Arfon wards numbered 8 to 12 and 16 to 29, together with the District of Dwyfor.

In 1996 Welsh local government was again reorganised. Arfon and Dwyfor became part of a Gwynedd unitary authority.

The Parliamentary Constituencies (Wales) Order 1995, based on the pre-1996 local authority areas, came into effect in 1997. It defined this constituency as:-

(i) The following wards of the Borough of Arfon, namely, Bethel, Bontnewydd, Cadnant, Deiniolen, Llanberis, Llandwrog, Llanllyfni, Llanrug, Llanwnda, Menai (Caernarfon), Peb-lig, Penisarwaun, Penygroes, Seiont, Talysarn, Waunfawr and Y Felinheli; and

(ii) the District of Dwyfor.

Following radical boundary changes undertaken by the Boundary Commission for Wales, this seat was abolished in time for the general election in 2010, replaced by Arfon and part of Dwyfor Meirionnydd.

Members of Parliament 1536–2010

Elections

Elections in the 1830s

 On petition, the election of Paget was declared void and Nanney was declared elected. The returning officer had included votes at Pwllheli which were not eligible, and these were deducted, leading to Nanney receiving 353 votes and Paget 343 votes. On a further petition, Paget was declared elected instead of Nanney.

Elections in the 1840s

Elections in the 1850s

Elections in the 1860s

Elections in the 1870s

Elections in the 1880s 

Hughes' death caused a by-election.

Elections in the 1890s

Elections in the 1900s

Elections in the 1910s

Elections in the 1920s

Elections in the 1930s

Elections in the 1940s

Elections in the 1950s

Elections in the 1960s

Elections in the 1970s

Elections in the 1980s

Elections in the 1990s

Elections in the 2000s

See also 
 1890 Caernarvon Boroughs by-election
 1945 Caernarvon Boroughs by-election
 List of parliamentary constituencies in Gwynedd

Notes and references

Sources
 Boundaries of Parliamentary Constituencies 1885–1972, compiled and edited by F. W. S. Craig (Parliamentary Reference Publications 1972)
 British Parliamentary Constituencies: A Statistical Compendium, by Ivor Crewe and Anthony Fox (Faber and Faber 1984)
 British Parliamentary Election Results 1832–1885, compiled and edited by F.W.S. Craig (The Macmillan Press 1977)
 F. W. S. Craig, British Parliamentary Election Results 1885 – 1918
 F. W. S. Craig, British Parliamentary Election Results 1918 – 1949
 British Parliamentary Election Results 1950–1973, compiled and edited by F.W.S. Craig (Parliamentary Research Services 1983)
 The House of Commons 1509–1558, by S.T. Bindoff (Secker & Warburg 1982)
 The House of Commons 1558–1603, by P.W. Hasler (HMSO 1981)
 The House of Commons 1715–1754, by Romney Sedgwick (HMSO 1970)
 The House of Commons 1754–1790, by Sir Lewis Namier and John Brooke (HMSO 1964)
 The Parliaments of England by Henry Stooks Smith (1st edition published in three volumes 1844–50), second edition edited (in one volume) by F.W.S. Craig (Political Reference Publications 1973)

Historic parliamentary constituencies in North Wales
Constituencies of the Parliament of the United Kingdom represented by a sitting Prime Minister
History of Gwynedd
Politics of Caernarfonshire
Constituencies of the Parliament of the United Kingdom established in 1536
Constituencies of the Parliament of the United Kingdom disestablished in 2010